Orange Walk Central is an electoral constituency in the Orange Walk District represented in the House of Representatives of the National Assembly of Belize.

Area Representatives

References 

 

Political divisions in Belize
Orange Walk Central
Belizean House constituencies established in 1984